Harry Falconer McLean (18 February 1881 - April 1961) was a Canadian railway contractor and eccentric philanthropist. He played a leading role in the construction of much of the trans-Canadian railways. He was well known for giving away large sums of money to people he had just met, and even throwing bills from hotel windows.

Early life
McLean was born in North Dakota, the son of Canadian parents. He studied at the North Dakota Business School in Fargo.

Dominion Atlantic Railway
McLean began work on the railways as a water boy for the Winston Brothers, and over the years moved up the ranks, eventually becoming president of the Dominion Atlantic Railway company.

Harry McLean was my godfather. He and my father were pals for most of their mid to later lives. I have many photos and newspaper articles, as well as stories to share for anyone interested in this giant among pioneering giants.

A strong patriot, one of the more significant contributions that he made to his country, was in building an airstrip in Alaska to accommodate the large B-24 Liberator bombers that would help the allies win the Second World War. President Roosevelt asked Harry to visit him at the White House in 1938 because he suspected that there was another   great war coming. To that date he had been unable to convince Congress to allot the necessary funding to build an airstrip in Alaska to accommodate huge heavy bombers that would inevitably be needed to fight the enemy.

On a handshake and with his own financing, Harry built the airstrip over the next two years. As the inevitability of war approached in 1940, panic set in as to America's preparedness for war. President Roosevelt was finally able to get the long overdue funding from Congress. He then announced, much to the relief of Congress that the airstrip was already built thanks to the generosity and abilities of Harry F. McLean, who had personally undertaken the task and completed it in record time.

Harry also was instrumental in selling war bonds and personally gave $500,000 to start the initiative nationwide. He himself had been a pilot in World War I and was deeply indebted to those that fought to save our country. He often frequented hospitals during World War II, anonymously giving baskets of money away to wounded veterans and hospital staff who knew him only as Mr X.

I travelled with him on a few occasions as a young lad, both in his Packard limousines (he had nine which he parked throughout the country), his planes (he had three) and on ferries and trains. I witnessed firsthand his generosity to all that he met. During the Depression he and my father would throw bundles of money from his hotel room window to the needy gathered below in the streets. At a time when there was no safety net for his workers who performed dangerous construction work and were sometimes killed on the job, Harry would place a plaque at the site of their death to "A Son of Martha". At his own expense he then looked after the widow and family for the rest of their lives.

His drive to give and achieve was enormous. When the money was all given away he would start all over again going back to Northern Canada to build and conquer the wilderness with some mega project that others had been unable or reluctant to attempt.

I was with him at his home in Merrickville, Ontario, shortly before his death in 1961. In his study were some of the mementos that he treasured. Magnificent ceremonial headdresses from the many First Nations tribes that had recognized him by making him an honorary chief. A red Rolodex on his desk that contained the private telephone numbers of the US president and all members of congress, and in another area, books and mementos scattered about, including those of Rudyard Kipling whom he greatly admired.

He gave me a small treasure when I left his home, a book entitled Poems to a Pioneer. Therein was one dedicated to Harry Falconer McLean, who by raw determination and ability alone tamed the wild North country. He was a great pioneer who let nothing stand in his way. He truly was larger than life and a legend in his own time. Seldom does such greatness come from just one person who achieves and gives back so much in such a unique way.

Boswell Mclean Malcolm

Philanthropy
McLean frequently handed out cash or cheques to people he encountered, including hotel staff and taxi drivers. He made many other private, anonymous donations, which led to him being known as Mr X until his identity was revealed, without his consent.

Personal life
McLean lived in Merrickville, Ontario, on the Rideau Canal. He was first married to Irene Robertson. His second wife was Margaret K. Fitzpatrick, known as Rita, to whom he was married until his death.

Legacy
A pub in Merrickville, Ontario now bears his name, in addition to an H. F. McLean Road.

Bibliography
Charland, Theresa (2007). Building an Empire: "Big Pants" Harry F. McLean and his Sons of Martha, Ontario: Riparian House
Finnigan, Joan Giants of Canada's Ottawa Valley, Ontario: General Store Publishing House
Barnes, Michael (1995) Great Northern Characters, Ontario: General Store Publishing House

References

External links
"Canada at War: Ontario: Golden Boy" at Time
Republicofmining.com
Ontario Marches North

1881 births
1961 deaths
Canadian philanthropists
People from North Dakota
Train drivers
20th-century philanthropists
American emigrants to Canada